Acanthiophilus is a genus of tephritid  or fruit flies in the family Tephritidae.

Species
A. brunneus Munro, 1934
A. ciconia Munro, 1957
A. helianthi (Rossi, 1794)
A. lugubris Hering, 1939
A. minor Morgulis & Freidburg, 2015
A. summissus Morgulis & Freidburg, 2015
A. unicus Morgulis & Freidburg, 2015
A. walkeri (Wollaston, 1858)

The following have been reassigned to other genera:
A. astrophorus Hering, 1939
A. coarctatus Hering, 1942
A. koehleri Hering, 1940
A. melanoxanthus Hering, 1938
A. trypaneodes Hering, 1937

Global distribution
Acanthiophilus is a predominantly Afrotropical genus. One species, A. helianthi Is found in Europe, to Mongolia, North Africa, Afghanistan & Thailand. as well as at the Canary islands, in India and Sri-Lanka.

References

External links
 

Tephritinae
Tephritidae genera
Taxa named by Theodor Becker
Diptera of Europe
Diptera of Asia
Diptera of Africa